Guacamaya is a group of plants in the family Rapateaceae described as a genus in 1931.

The only known species is Guacamaya superba, native to the Río Guainía region along the border of Colombia (Vaupés and Guainía) and Venezuela (Amazonas).

References

Rapateaceae
Flora of Venezuela
Flora of Colombia